Isaac Clason Delaplaine (October 27, 1817 – July 17, 1866) was a lawyer and politician who was a U.S. Representative from New York during the American Civil War.

Biography
Born in New York City, Delaplaine was the son of a successful merchant.  He graduated from Columbia College (now Columbia University) in 1834.  He received a gold medal for finishing first in his class, as well as silver medals for placing first in studies of: moral and political philosophy; Greek and Roman literature; and mathematics and astronomy.  He received the bronze medal for second place in natural, experimental and mechanical philosophy.

Delaplaine received a master's degree from Columbia in 1837.  He studied law, was admitted to the bar in 1840, and practiced in New York City.

He was elected as a Democrat to the Thirty-seventh Congress (March 4, 1861 – March 3, 1863).  Serving during the American Civil War, Delaplaine joined most other Democrats in supporting Abraham Lincoln's war measures, but opposing the emancipation of slaves and the suspension of Habeas corpus.

He died in New York City on July 17, 1866.  He was interred in Green-Wood Cemetery in Brooklyn, New York.

Family
Delaplaine was a son of John Ferris Delaplaine (1786-1854) and Julia Ann (Clason) Delaplaine (1794-1866).  His brother John Ferris Delaplaine Jr. (1815-1885) served as secretary of the U.S. legation in Vienna from 1866 to 1883.

In 1838, Delaplaine married Matilda Post (1821-1907).  They were the parents of two daughters, Julie (1840-1915) and Florence (1849-1926).  Delaplaine's daughter Julie married attorney George Richard Schieffelin (1836-1910).  His daughter Florence (1849-1926) was the second wife of Hamilton Fish II.

References

The Commencement of Columbia College.  American Railroad Journal and Advocate of Internal Improvements. Volume 3.  Pages 636–637.  October 4–10, 1834.

1817 births
1866 deaths
Burials at Green-Wood Cemetery
Columbia College (New York) alumni
New York (state) lawyers
Democratic Party members of the United States House of Representatives from New York (state)
19th-century American politicians
19th-century American lawyers